The Highway 79 Bridge was a historic bridge in Clarendon, Arkansas. It was a tall two-span Warren truss bridge, formerly carrying two-lane U.S. Route 79 (US 79), a major arterial highway in the region, across the White River just west of the city's downtown. The bridge was built in 1930-31 by the Austin Bridge Company.

The bridge was listed on the National Register of Historic Places in 1984, and was closed in August 2016 when a replacement bridge to the south opened. Since its closing, the 1931 bridge has been subject to local restoration efforts as a bike and pedestrian path. The steel truss of the bridge was demolished using explosives on November 19, 2019, and was removed from the National Register in 2020.

Gallery

See also
List of bridges documented by the Historic American Engineering Record in Arkansas
List of bridges on the National Register of Historic Places in Arkansas
National Register of Historic Places listings in Monroe County, Arkansas

References

External links

Road bridges on the National Register of Historic Places in Arkansas
Bridges completed in 1930
U.S. Route 79
Bridges of the United States Numbered Highway System
Historic American Engineering Record in Arkansas
National Register of Historic Places in Monroe County, Arkansas
Steel bridges in the United States
Warren truss bridges in the United States
Former National Register of Historic Places in Arkansas
1930 establishments in Arkansas
Demolished buildings and structures in Arkansas
Transportation in Monroe County, Arkansas
Demolished bridges in the United States
2019 establishments in Arkansas